PitchMen (original name: But Wait...There's More) is a docudrama television program produced for the Discovery Channel in the United States. The show followed infomercial producers and talent Billy Mays and Anthony "Sully" Sullivan as they attempted to sell various inventions through direct-response marketing, mainly through Telebrands, one of the largest direct response/infomercial companies. The series was narrated by Thom Beers. Each episode typically focused on two different products.

History
Each episode typically begins with Billy Mays and Anthony Sullivan being pitched different products by their inventors. Two products are then selected and are field tested with peoples' opinions gathered on the products. If successful in the field test, Billy and Sully would create an infomercial which is then produced and played in test markets after which the inventors are notified of the amount of success that the commercial generated. For products that generated a successful level of consumer interest, high praise is given by Billy and Sully. For products that did not fare as well, the inventor is notified, and the future of the product is discussed briefly including the possibility of collaboration on tweaking the commercial for a later airing date.

It was unknown whether or not the series would continue following Mays' death on June 28, 2009. The Discovery Channel ran an all day marathon of episodes on July 1 as a tribute, which concluded with the season finale, itself edited to end with a tribute to Mays. On July 9 a special tribute episode entitled "Pitchman: A Tribute to Billy Mays" aired with comments from friends, co-workers and family.  The status of the second season was undecided until July 15, when a press-release was put out by Discovery to announce that the show would be renewed for a second season, with Mays' eponymous son taking his late father's place. The second season premiered on August 19, 2010 with solely Anthony Sullivan starring in commercials. Sully sometimes brings in others to help him decide with product such as Telebrands CEO AJ Khubani. However, without Billy Mays on the show, PitchMen was cancelled after 2 seasons.

Episodes

Season 1: 2009

Pitchman: A Tribute to Billy Mays

Season 2: 2010-2011
On July 15, 2009, Discovery Channel announced they were renewing the show for a second season, with Mays' eponymous son Billy Mays III joining Anthony Sullivan and Thom Beers. The second season premiered on August 19, 2010. Starting September 2, 2010, Discovery Channel has removed Pitchmen from its regular Thursday night at 9pm slot without any explanation. However, new episodes returned to Discovery Channel beginning January 18, 2011 but with only Anthony Sullivan helming the show. But on its website, Discovery Channel has trimmed the list of season 2 episodes to five, indicating the possibility the series has been cancelled, although no official cancellation announcement has been made.

Billy Mays tribute marathon
On July 1, 2009, as a tribute to the late Billy Mays, the Discovery Channel aired an all-day marathon of PitchMen  leading up to the show's season finale.  Commercial breaks during the marathon included one of several brief montages saluting Mays.  The channel's digital on-screen graphic featured his photograph, along with the words Billy Mays Jr. 1958–2009.

See also 
List of products that Billy Mays pitched
As seen on TV
New product development
Pitch People (1999 film)

References

External links
 

Discovery Channel original programming
2009 American television series debuts
2011 American television series endings
Infomercials